The 2019 Thai League 4 Northern region is a region in the regional stage of the 2019 Thai League 4. A total of 10 teams located in Northern, Western, and Upper central of Thailand will compete in the league of the Northern region.

Teams

Number of teams by province

Stadiums and locations

League table

Standings

Positions by round

Notes:* The reserve of T1 and T2 teams, also known as team (B) could not qualified and relegated, so that the teams in lower or upper positions would be qualified or relegated.

Results by round

Results
For the Northern region, a total 27 matches per team competing in 3 legs. In the 3rd leg, the winner on head-to-head result of the 1st and the 2nd leg will be home team. If head-to-head result are tie, must to find the home team from head-to-head goals different. If all of head-to-head still tie, must to find the home team from penalty kickoff on the end of each 2nd leg match (This penalty kickoff don't bring to calculate points on league table, it's only the process to find the home team in 3rd leg).

Attendances

Overall statistical table

Attendances by home match played

Source: Thai League
Note: Some error of T4 official match report 18 May 2019 (Singburi Bangrajun 0–2 Phitsanulok).
 Some error of T4 official match report 25 August 2019 (Singburi Bangrajun 4–2 JL Chiangmai United (B)).

Season statistics

Top scorers by team

See also
 2019 Thai League 1
 2019 Thai League 2
 2019 Thai League 3
 2019 Thai League 4
 2019 Thailand Amateur League
 2019 Thai FA Cup
 2019 Thai League Cup
 2019 Thailand Champions Cup

References

External links
 Official website of Thai League

4